Richard Bateman may refer to:
Richard Bateman (botanist) (born 1958), British botanist
Richard Bateman (cricketer) (1849–1913), English cricketer
Richard Bateman (bassist), bassist with Nasty Savage

See also
Richard Bateman-Robson (1753–1827), MP